David Alejandro Jiménez Rodríguez (born 15 April 1992) is a Costa Rican professional boxer, who has held the WBA Gold flyweight title since June 2021.

As an amateur he won bronze medals in the light flyweight event at the 2013 World Championships as well as the 2015 Pan American Games in the flyweight event.

Professional boxing career
Jiménez made his professional debut against Emmanuel Villamar on 16 February 2019, and won the fight by a third-round knockout. He amassed a 7-0 record during the next eight months, winning all but one of those fights by way of stoppage.

Jiménez was scheduled to fight Jerson Ortiz for the vacant WBC Latino flyweight title on 18 February 2021, at the Hotel El Panama in Panama City. Jiménez had a poor start to the fight, as he was knocked down in the second round, but nonetheless won the fight by unanimous decision, with all three judges scoring the fight 98-90 in his favor.

Jiménez was scheduled to face Edwin Cano for the vacant WBA Gold World flyweight title on 19 June 2021, four months after winning his first professional title. Jiménez won the fight by a third-round knockout. Jiménez was booked to face Darwin Martinez on 17 March 2022, at the Hotel Barcelo San Jose Palacio in San Jose. He won the fight by a fifth-round knockout.

Jiménez was booked to face Ricardo Rafael Sandoval in a WBA flyweight title eliminator on 16 July 2022, on the Ryan Garcia and Javier Fortuna undercard. He won the fight by majority decision. Two of the judges scored the bout 114–112 in his favor, while the third judge scored the bout as an even 113–113 draw. Jiménez knocked Sandoval down in the eleventh round and was deducted a point in the seventh round for holding and hitting.

On August 1, 2022, the WBA formally ordered their reigning flyweight champion Artem Dalakian to make a mandatory title defense against Jiménez. On November 20, it was revealed that they had reached an agreement for the bout to take place in late January 2023. The fight took place on January 28, 2023, at the OVO Arena Wembley in London, England, on the undercard of the Artur Beterbiev and Anthony Yarde unified light heavyweight title bout. Jiménez lost the fight by unanimous decision, with two scorecards of 115–113 and one scorecard of 116–112.

Professional boxing record

References

External links
 
 
 

1992 births
Living people
People from Cartago Province
Costa Rican male boxers
Light-flyweight boxers
Flyweight boxers
Southpaw boxers
AIBA World Boxing Championships medalists
Pan American Games bronze medalists for Costa Rica
Pan American Games medalists in boxing
Boxers at the 2011 Pan American Games
Boxers at the 2015 Pan American Games
Medalists at the 2015 Pan American Games